Dr William Hobbs (1822 – 8 December 1890) was a doctor and politician in colonial Queensland.

Hobbs was born in London, England, and was one of the earliest colonists of Queensland, practised as a doctor in Brisbane, and was for a considerable period the Government medical officer. Accompanied by his aged mother, he arrived at Moreton Bay on 1 May 1849 as surgeon of the Chaseley, the second of John Dunmore Lang's migrant ships. After a brief period at Drayton on the Darling Downs, he commenced practice in Brisbane in September.

He was nominated to the Queensland Legislative Council and was a member of the first responsible government, without portfolio, under the premiership of Robert Herbert, the permanent Under-Secretary for the Colonies, from April 1861 to January 1862. Mr. Hobbs married Anna Louisa Barton, sister of Edmund Barton, of Sydney. He died in Brisbane on 8 December 1890 and was buried in Toowong Cemetery.

References

1822 births
1890 deaths
Members of the Queensland Legislative Council
Australian surgeons
Burials at Toowong Cemetery
19th-century Australian politicians
Pre-Separation Queensland